C.L.L Crystal Lover Light is Crystal Kay's first album. The album was released when she was 14 years old. Unlike her later albums, this release contains other styles of music than urban pop, with several songs being acoustic and containing a blues vibe. The song "Shadows of Desire" was released as a single, simultaneously with the album. This album reached #60 on the weekly Oricon chart, and stayed on the chart for four weeks. In all, the album sold a total of 19,930 copies.

Track listing

Charts

Release history

References

External links

References

2000 debut albums
Crystal Kay albums
Epic Records albums